Dragiša Pešić (Serbian Cyrillic: Драгиша Пешић; 8 August 1954 – 8 September 2016) was a Yugoslav politician. He was the second last Prime Minister of  Federal Republic of Yugoslavia.

Biography
Pešić was born in Danilovgrad on 8 August 1954. He studied economics at the University of Sarajevo's Faculty of Economics, where he graduated in 1978.

He was President of the executive committee of Podgorica Municipality, a member of the Chamber of Citizens in the Yugoslav Federal Assembly. In 1998, he became Finance Minister of Yugoslavia, in the governments of Prime Ministers Momir Bulatović and Zoran Žižić.

Dragiša Pešić became Prime Minister of Yugoslavia on 24 July 2001, after Žižić resigned in protest of the extradition of Slobodan Milošević to the ICTY.

Pešić became a member of the Senate of the State Audit Institution (DRI) of Montenegro in December 2007.

He died on 8 September 2016 at the age of 62. He was buried on 10 September in the village of Frutak near Danilovgrad.

References

External links
 Biography on the Socialist People's Party's Official Site 

1954 births
2016 deaths
Finance ministers of Yugoslavia
People from Danilovgrad
Socialist People's Party of Montenegro politicians